Philotheca myoporoides subsp. brevipedunculata is a subspecies of flowering plant in the family Rutaceae and is endemic to New South Wales. It is a shrub with oblong or egg-shaped leaves and white or pink flowers arranged singly or in groups of up to three in leaf axils.

Description
The stamens are free from each other and hairy near the base. Flowering mainly occurs in spring and autumn.

Taxonomy and naming
This subspecies was first formally described in 1998 by Michael Bayly in the journal Muelleria.

Distribution and habitat
This subspecies grows from coastal to escarpment ranges from Sassafras to the Moruya district in south-eastern New South Wales.

References

myoporoides
Flora of New South Wales
Sapindales of Australia